Simmons Island is a small island in Grizzly Bay (part of Suisun Bay) in the San Francisco Bay Area of California.
 It is part of Solano County, and included within Reclamation District 2127. It is shown as "Simmons Island" on an 1850 survey map of the San Francisco Bay area made by Cadwalader Ringgold, and as "Simons Island" on an 1854 map of the area by Henry Lange. It is labeled, along with Deadman Island, Joice Island, Grizzly Island, Ryer Island and Roe Island, on a 1902 USGS map of the area.

References

Islands of the San Francisco Bay Area
Islands of Northern California
Islands of Solano County, California
Islands of Suisun Bay